The following tables compare Ancient Greek dictionaries, in any language.

Main lexicographical works

Translated editions of dictionaries

Etymological and other dictionaries

References
 Panagiotis Filos (2018) The Brill Dictionary of Ancient Greek (review) in Bryn Mawr Classical Review
 Pauline Hire The Cambridge New Greek Lexicon Project in The Classical World Vol. 98, No. 2 (Winter, 2005), pp. 179-185
 Cambridge Greek Lexicon (2021), official project webpage
 The Cambridge Greek Lexicon: An Interview with Prof. James Diggle, Oct 28, 2019

External links
 Grex Ancien Dictionnaire
 Cambridge Greek Lexicon

Notes

Ancient Greek dictionaries
Ancient Greek dictionaries